The men's floorball tournament at the 2019 Southeast Asian Games was held at the University of the Philippines College of Human Kinetics Gymnasium in Quezon City, Metro Manila, Philippines from 25 November to 1 December 2019.

Squads

Results
All times are Philippine Standard Time (UTC+08:00)

Preliminaries

Final round

Bronze medal match

Gold medal match

See also
Women's tournament

References

External links
  

Men